Columbus City Township is a township in Louisa County, Iowa. It was organized in 1841.

References

Townships in Louisa County, Iowa
Townships in Iowa